The 2013–14 Luge World Cup was a multi race tournament over a season for luge organised by the FIL. The season started on 16 November 2013 in Lillehammer, Norway and ended on 26 January 2014 in Sigulda, Latvia. After the World Cup, the athletes moved for two weeks to Sochi for the Luge event in the XXII Olympic Winter Games.

The defending individual World Champions were Felix Loch and Natalie Geisenberger, both from Germany. Athletes from Germany dominated the 2012–13 World Cup season, as they were also the defending World Champions in Men's Double (Tobias Wendl/Tobias Arlt) and Team relay.

Calendar 
Below is the schedule for the 2013/14 season.

Results

Men's singles 

 Race shortened to one run due to snowfall.

Doubles

Women's singles

Team relay

Standings

Men's singles

|-
|align="center" colspan=12|Luge Men FIL Ranking 2013/14
|- class="wikitable sortable"  style="background:#f7f8ff; text-align:center; border:gray solid 1px;"
|- style="background:#ccc;"
! style="width:10px;"|Pos.
! style="width:215px;"|Luger
! style="width:45px;"|LIL
! style="width:45px;"|IGL
! style="width:45px;"|WIN
! style="width:45px;"|WHI
! style="width:45px;"|PKC
! style="width:45px;"|KON
! style="width:45px;"|OBE
! style="width:45px;"|ALT
! style="width:45px;"|SIG
! style="width:45px;"|Points
|-
| 1. ||align="left"|  || style="background:#c96;"|3 || style="background:gold;"|1 || 4 || style="background:gold;"|1 || 5 || style="background:gold;"|1 || style="background:gold;"|1 || style="background:gold;"|1 || — ||| 685
|-
| 2. ||align="left"|  || 4 || 5 || style="background:silver;"|2 || 10 || style="background:gold;"|1 || style="background:silver;"|2 || 22 || 5 || style="background:gold;"|1 || 595
|-  
| 3. ||align="left"|  || style="background:gold;"|1 || style="background:#c96;"|3 || 5 || style="background:#c96;"|3 || 4 || 4 || 9 || 28 || style="background:#c96;"|3 || 534
|-
| 4. ||align="left"|  || style="background:silver;"|2 || style="background:silver;"|2  || style="background:#c96;"|3 || 4 || 6 || 6 || 5 || 4 || — || 515
|-
| 5. ||align="left"|  || 14 || 4 || 15 || style="background:silver;"|2 || style="background:silver;"|2 || 21 || 18 || 9 || 7 || 412
|-
| 6. ||align="left"|  || 13 || 9 || 11 || 5 || 15 || 8 || style="background:silver;"|2 || style="background:#c96;"|3 || — || 381
|-
| 7. ||align="left"|  || 20 || 6 || 6 || 6 || 8 || 5 || 20 || 6 || 10 || 375
|-
| 8. ||align="left"|  || 5 || 11 || 21 || 14 || style="background:#c96;"|3 || 19 || 7 || 13 || 11 || 339
|-
| 9. ||align="left"|  || 29 || 8 || 18 || 8 || 10 || 7 || 6 || 11 || 13 || 315
|-
| 10. ||align="left"|  || 11 || 16 || 10 || 7 || 18 || style="background:#c96;"|3 || 17 || 7 || 22 || 304
|-
| 11. ||align="left"|  || 6 || 7 || 29 || 12 || 9 || 9 || dnf || 12 || 15 || 284
|-
| 12. ||align="left"|  || 24 || 12 || 17 || 13 || 10 || 26 || — || 8 || style="background:silver;"|2 || 281
|-
| 13. ||align="left"|  || 8 || 17 || 19 || 25 || 13 || — || 8 || 17 || 4 || 268
|-
| 14. ||align="left"|  || 7 || 10 || 30 || — || — || dnf || 4 || style="background:silver;"|2 || dns || 253
|-
| 15. ||align="left"|  || 25 || 25 || 13 || 9 || 7 || — || 24 || 10 || 9 || 239
|-
| 16. ||align="left"|  || 10 || 21 || 7 || — || — || 12 || 23 || 16 || 6 || 227
|-
| 17. ||align="left"|  || 18 || 20 || 24 || 22 || 23 || 11 || 12 || 25 || 16 || 205
|-
| 18. ||align="left"|  || 19  || 13 || 8 || — || — || 13 || — || 22 || 28 || 192
|-
| 19. ||align="left"|  || 12 || 31 || 9 || 20 || — || dnf || 11 || 19 || 20 || 189
|-
| 20. ||align="left"|  || — || — || style="background:gold;"|1 || 15 || 24 || 17 || — || — || 23 || 185
|-

Men's Doubles

|-
|align="center" colspan=12|Luge Doubles FIL Ranking 2013/14 
|- class="wikitable sortable"  style="background:#f7f8ff; text-align:center; border:gray solid 1px;"
|- style="background:#ccc;"
! style="width:10px;"|Pos.
! style="width:340px;"|Luger
! style="width:45px;"|LIL
! style="width:45px;"|IGL
! style="width:45px;"|WIN
! style="width:45px;"|WHI
! style="width:45px;"|PKC
! style="width:45px;"|KON
! style="width:45px;"|OBE
! style="width:45px;"|ALT
! style="width:45px;"|SIG
! style="width:45px;"|Points
|-  
| 1. ||align="left"|  || style="background:gold;"|1 || style="background:silver;"|2 || style="background:gold;"|1 || style="background:gold;"|1 || style="background:gold;"|1 || style="background:gold;"|1 || style="background:silver;"|2 || style="background:gold;"|1 || — || 770
|-
| 2. ||align="left"|  || style="background:silver;"|2 || style="background:gold;"|1  || dnf || style="background:silver;"|2  || style="background:#c96;"|3 || style="background:silver;"|2 || style="background:gold;"|1 || style="background:silver;"|2 || — || 630
|-
| 3. ||align="left"|  || 4 || 4 || style="background:silver;"|2 || 8 || 5 || 6 || 4 || 10 || style="background:gold;"|1 || 548
|-
| 4. ||align="left"|  || 9 || style="background:#c96;"|3 || style="background:#c96;"|3 || style="background:#c96;"|3 || 6 || 4 || 5 || style="background:#c96;"|3 || 4 || 544
|-
| 5. ||align="left"|  || 11 || 6 || style="background:#c96;"|3 || 7 || 4 || 7 || 6 || 6 || 7 || 452
|-
| 6. ||align="left"|  || style="background:#c96;"|3 || 5 || — || 5 || style="background:silver;"|2 || dnf || 14 || 5 || style="background:#c96;"|3 || 438
|-
| 7. ||align="left"|  || 19 || 12 || 5 || 4 || 8 || style="background:#c96;"|3 || 8 || 8 || 8 || 407
|-
| 8. ||align="left"|  || 5 || 9 || 7 || — || — || 10 || style="background:#c96;"|3 || 4 || style="background:silver;"|2 || 391
|-
| 9. ||align="left"|  || 12 || 7 || 6 || 10 || 10 || 5 || 12 || 9 || 5 || 326
|-
| 10. ||align="left"|  || 13 || 15 || 17 || 9 || 9 || dnf || 11 || 16 || 13 || 267
|-
| 11. ||align="left"|  || 7 || 16 || 8 || — || — || 12 || 20 || 7 || 6 || 262
|-
| 12. ||align="left"|  || 14 || 17 || 26 || 14 || 14 || 14 || 10 || 14 || 10 || 251
|-
| 13. ||align="left"|  || 22 || 14 || 16 || 12 || 11 || — || 9 || 11 || 14 || 239
|-
| 14. ||align="left"|  || 20 || 26 || 11 || 15 || 13 || dnf || — || 18 || 9 || 226
|-
| 15. ||align="left"|  || 15 || 8 || 21 || — || — || 8 || 13 || 13 || 15 || 216
|-
| 16. ||align="left"|  || 18 || 20 || 13 || 23 || 18 || 17 || — || 17 || 17 || 206
|-
| 16. ||align="left"|  || 16 || 19 || 14 || 16 || 16 || 16 || 17 || — || 12 || 206
|-
| 18. ||align="left"|  || 10 || 11 || 9 || — || — || 11 || 18 || 12 || — || 198
|-
| 19. ||align="left"|  || 21 || — || — || — || — || 15 || 16 || — || 22 || 184
|-
| 20. ||align="left"|  || — || — || dnf || 17 || 19 || 13 || 15 || 19 || 16 || 183
|-

Women's singles

|-
|align="center" colspan=12|Luge Women FIL Ranking 2013/14
|- class="wikitable sortable"  style="background:#f7f8ff; text-align:center; border:gray solid 1px;"
|- style="background:#ccc;"
! style="width:10px;"|Pos.
! style="width:215px;"|Luger
! style="width:45px;"|LIL
! style="width:45px;"|IGL
! style="width:45px;"|WIN
! style="width:45px;"|WHI
! style="width:45px;"|PKC
! style="width:45px;"|KON
! style="width:45px;"|OBE
! style="width:45px;"|ALT
! style="width:45px;"|SIG
! style="width:45px;"|Points
|-  
| 1. ||align="left"|  || style="background:gold;"|1 || style="background:gold;"|1  || style="background:gold;"|1 || style="background:gold;"|1 || style="background:gold;"|1 || style="background:gold;"|1 || style="background:silver;"|2 || style="background:gold;"|1 || —  || 785
|-
| 2. ||align="left"|  || style="background:#c96;"|3 || 7 || 4 || style="background:silver;"|2 || style="background:#c96;"|3 || style="background:#c96;"|3 || 5 || style="background:silver;"|2 || style="background:silver;"|2 || 626
|-
| 3. ||align="left"|  || 13 || style="background:silver;"|2 || style="background:silver;"|2 || 4 || 7 || style="background:silver;"|2 || style="background:gold;"|1 || 4 || — || 551
|-
| 4. ||align="left"|  || 7 || style="background:#c96;"|3 || style="background:#c96;"|3 || style="background:#c96;"|3 || style="background:silver;"|2 || 7 || 4 || 7 || — || 493
|-
| 5. ||align="left"|  || 47 || 4 || 9 || 6 || 5 || 4 || style="background:#c96;"|3 || 5 || 7 || 432
|-
| 6. ||align="left"|  || 8 || 6 || 6 || 5 || 8 || 13 || 10 || 6 || 4 || 415
|-
| 7. ||align="left"|  || 12 || 23 || 7 || 7 || 4 || 15 || 12 || 21 || style="background:gold;"|1 || 384
|-
| 8. ||align="left"|  || style="background:silver;"|2 || 11 || 5 || — || — || 11 || 6 || 8 || 5 || 355
|-
| 9. ||align="left"|  || 18 || 24 || 10 || 11 || 10 || 5 || 14 || style="background:#c96;"|3 || 6 || 349
|-
| 10. ||align="left"|  || 6 || 9 || 18 || 12 || 12 || 8 || 13 || 11 || 13 || 312
|-
| 11. ||align="left"|  || 10 || 13 || 22 || 13 || 17 || 14 || 9 || 15 || style="background:#c96;"|3 || 302
|-
| 12. ||align="left"|  || 16 || 14 || 14 || 19 || 20 || 6 || 7 || 9 || 14 || 287
|-
| 13. ||align="left"|  || 20 || 17 || 11 || 8 || 15 || dnf || 8 || 13 || 9 || 274
|-
| 14. ||align="left"|  || dnf || 8 || 36 || 15 || 9 || 10 || 16 || 14 || 12 || 249
|-
| 15. ||align="left"|  || 4 || 18 || 8 || 18 || 23 || dsq || — || 25 || 11 || 230
|-
| 16. ||align="left"|  || 11 || 20 || 17 || — || — || 9 || 15 || 10 || 8 || 227
|-
| 17. ||align="left"|  || 21 || 19 || 16 || 14 || dsq || 12 || 17 || 11 || 16 || 226
|-
| 18. ||align="left"|  || 5 || 5 || 15 || 9 || 11 || dnf || — || — || — || 225
|-
| 19. ||align="left"|  || 15 || 15 || 20 || dnf || 13 || 17 || 11 || 27 || 15 || 217
|-
| 20. ||align="left"|  || 42 || 10 || 12 || 28 || 14 || dnf || 18 || 16 || 18 || 197
|-

Team relay

|-
|align="center" colspan=11|Luge Team relay FIL Ranking 2013/14
|- class="wikitable sortable"  style="background:#f7f8ff; text-align:center; border:gray solid 1px;"
|- style="background:#ccc;"
! style="width:10px;"|Pos.
! style="width:215px;"|Team
! style="width:45px;"|IGL
! style="width:45px;"|WIN
! style="width:45px;"|WHI
! style="width:45px;"|PKC
! style="width:45px;"|KON
! style="width:45px;"|ALT
! style="width:45px;"|Points
|-  
| 1. ||align="left"|  || style="background:gold;"|1 || 9 || style="background:gold;"|1 || style="background:gold;"|1 || style="background:gold;"|1 || style="background:#c96;"|3 || 509
|-
| 2. ||align="left"|  || style="background:silver;"|2 || dsq || style="background:silver;"|2 || 4 || style="background:silver;"|2 || style="background:silver;"|2 || 400
|-
| 3. ||align="left"|  || 4 || style="background:silver;"|2 || 4 || style="background:silver;"|2 || 5 || 6 || 395
|-
| 4. ||align="left"|  || style="background:#c96;"|3 || style="background:gold;"|1 || 5 || 5 || style="background:#c96;"|3 || dsq || 350
|-
| 5. ||align="left"|  || 6 || 4 || 6 || 7 || 6 || 4 || 316
|-
| 6. ||align="left"|  || 5 || style="background:#c96;"|3 || style="background:#c96;"|3 || style="background:#c96;"|3 || dsq || 9 || 304
|-
| 7. ||align="left"|  || dsq || dnf || 7 || 6 || 4 || style="background:gold;"|1 || 256
|-
| 8. ||align="left"|  || 7 || dnf || 8 || 8 || 7 || 5 || 231
|-
| 9. ||align="left"|  || 9 || 7 || dnf || 9 || 8 || 7 || 212
|-
| 10. ||align="left"|  || 8 || 5 || 10 || 10 || 9 || dns || 208
|-
| 11. ||align="left"|  || 10 || 6 || 9 || 11 || 10 || dnf || 195
|-
| 12. ||align="left"|  || 13 || 8 || 11 || 13 || — || 8 || 178
|-
| 13. ||align="left"|  || 11 || dnf || dsq || 12 || — || — || 66
|-
| 14. ||align="left"|  || 12 || dnf || — || dsq || — || — || 32
|-

References

2013-14
2013 in luge
2014 in luge